The Weeping Song is a song by Nick Cave and the Bad Seeds appearing on their 1990 album The Good Son. It released as a single in 1990 by Mute Records.

Accolades 

(*) designates unordered lists.

Formats and track listing 
All songs written by Nick Cave, except where noted.
UK 7" single (MUTE 118)
 "The Weeping Song" – 4:20
 "Cocks 'n' Asses" (Nick Cave, Victor Van Vugt) – 5:45

UK CD single (CD MUTE 118)
 "The Weeping Song" – 4:19
 "Cocks 'n' Asses" (Nick Cave, Victor Van Vugt) – 5:46
 "Helpless" (Neil Young) – 4:30

US CD single (9 66605-2)
 "The Weeping Song" – 4:19
 "The Train Song" – 4:46
 "The B-Side Song" (Nick Cave, Victor Van Vugt) – 5:46 ("Cocks 'n' Asses" retitled for the US market)
 "Helpless" (Neil Young) – 4:30

Personnel
Adapted from The Weeping Song liner notes.

Nick Cave and The Bad Seeds
Blixa Bargeld – lead vocals, guitar
Nick Cave – lead vocals, piano
Mick Harvey – bass guitar, vibraphone, shaker
Kid Congo Powers – guitar
Thomas Wydler – drums

Production and additional personnel
 The Bad Seeds – production
 Polly Borland – cover art, photography

Release history

References

External links 
 

1990 songs
1990 singles
Nick Cave songs
Songs written by Nick Cave
Elektra Records singles
Mute Records singles